The 1941 Iowa State Teachers Panthers football team represented Iowa State Teachers College in the North Central Conference during the 1941 college football season. In their sixth season under head coach Clyde Starbeck, the team compiled a 5–3 record (5–0 against NCC opponents), won the conference championship, and outscored opponents by a total of 151 to 29.

Four Panthers players were selected by the college sports editors to the 1941 All-North Central Conference football team: tackle Don Barnhart, guard Aaron Linn, center Bob Hunt, and halfback Gene Goodwillie.

Schedule

References

Iowa State Teachers
Northern Iowa Panthers football seasons
North Central Conference football champion seasons
Iowa State Teachers Panthers football